Diane Edmund Griffin (born May 5, 1940) is the university distinguished professor and a professor in the Department of Molecular Microbiology and Immunology at the Johns Hopkins Bloomberg School of Public Health, where she was the department chair from 1994-2015. She is also the current vice-president of the National Academy of Sciences. She holds joint appointments in the departments of Neurology and Medicine. In 2004, Griffin was elected to the United States National Academy of Sciences (NAS) in the discipline of microbial biology.

Education and training
After earning her undergraduate degree from Augustana College in Rock Island, Illinois, she joined a join MD/PhD graduate program at Stanford University, where she pursued research on immunoglobulins. Griffin received her PhD and MD in 1968 and remained at Stanford Hospital for her internship and residency.

Griffin performed postdoctoral research in virology at the Johns Hopkins University School of Medicine. Along with Janice E. Clements and others, Griffin is a notable trainee of neurovirology specialist Richard T. Johnson.

Career
Griffin became a faculty member at Johns Hopkins in 1973 in the Department of Neurology. She attained the rank of full professor in 1986. In 1994, Griffin became the chair of the Department of Molecular Microbiology and Immunology at the Johns Hopkins School of Hygiene and Public Health, now known as the Bloomberg School of Public Health.

Research

Virology has been Griffin's specialty since her postdoctoral work. Her research examines how the body responds to viral infection. Griffin has placed particular emphasis on the central nervous system, researching the effects of Sindbis virus and the measles virus on the brain. Further, her work has contributed to our knowledge of how long-term immunity to re-infection with measles develops.

Honors and awards
Griffin has received numerous awards and honorific memberships.
Membership in the National Academy of Sciences (2004)
Membership of the American Academy of Microbiology
Membership in the National Academy of Medicine
Membership in the American Philosophical Society
Inducted into the Maryland Women's Hall of Fame
Awarded the Rudolf Virchow Medal, University of Würzburg
Awarded the Wallace Sterling Lifetime Alumni Achievement Award, Stanford University
Awarded the Pioneer in NeuroVirology Award by the International Society for NeuroVirology at the 9th International Symposium on NeuroVirology held in Miami, Florida, in 2009.

References

Members of the United States National Academy of Sciences
American women biologists
Women academic administrators
American women physicians
Living people
Place of birth missing (living people)
1940 births
American virologists
Stanford University alumni
Augustana College (Illinois) alumni
21st-century Canadian politicians
American academic administrators
Members of the American Philosophical Society
21st-century American women
Members of the National Academy of Medicine